Brandenburg was the name given to a wolfpack of German U-boats that operated during the World War II Battle of the Atlantic in 1941 from 15 September 1941 to 2 October 1941

Brandenburg
The group was responsible for sinking 10 merchant ships and 1 warship (925 tons).

Raiding history

U-boats

Bibliography

References

 

Wolfpacks of 1941
Wolfpack Brandenburg